John Flanagan (born 9 January 1956 in Feohanagh, County Limerick) is a retired Irish sportsperson.  He played hurling with his local club Feohanagh-Castlemahon and was a member of the Limerick senior inter-county team in the 1970s and 1980s.

References

1956 births
Living people
Feohanagh-Castlemahon hurlers
Limerick inter-county hurlers